Judo competitions at the 2008 Summer Olympics in Beijing were held from August 9 to August 15 at the Beijing Science and Technology University Gymnasium.

This was the fifth Olympics for Driulys González (Cuba), Mária Pekli (Australia), Ryoko Tamura-Tani (Japan). The only other judokas to compete at five Olympics are Belgian Robert Van de Walle and Puerto Rican judoka-bobsledder Jorge Bonnet.

Medal table

Medal summary

Men's events

Women's events

Qualification

Together with 366 directly qualified athletes, there will be 20 invitational places from a Tripartite Commission (genders and categories are yet to be decided), making up a total athlete quota of 386 athletes—217 men, 147 women and 22 places not yet allocated to a gender.

An NOC may enter up to one athlete per weight category. The qualifying places will be allocated as follows:

 Two additional places will be awarded to this union, but gender and weight categories are to be defined.

 If the host nation qualifies athletes directly through the world championships or Asian continental qualification system, the reserved entry places will be reallocated as part of the Asian continental qualification.

Continental qualification places will be allocated through the ranking system based on the major tournaments on the continent (continental championships, qualification tournaments). More important tournaments and tournaments closer to the Olympics will carry more points. Deadline for the unions to confirm the places was May 21, 2008.

See also 
Judo at the 2008 Summer Paralympics

External links
 
 European Judo Union Olympic Classification
 2008 Olympic Qualification System
 Judo – Official Results Book

 
2008 Summer Olympics events
2008
Olympics
Judo competitions in China